Natalie Grainger (born 8 July 1977), also known for a period by her former married name Natalie Pohrer, is a professional female squash player.

Grainger was born in Manchester, United Kingdom but raised in South Africa, which she represented in the 1998 Commonwealth Games, winning 2 bronze medals.  She reached the World No. 1 ranking in June 2003. She was runner-up at the World Open in 2002, and at the British Open in 2004. She has represented South Africa, England and her adopted home country the United States (where she moved to when she married her now ex-husband Eddie Pohrer) in international squash. In 2018, she won her third World Masters title.

She served as President of WISPA for many years.

World Open

Finals: 1 (0 title, 1 runner-up)

Major World Series final appearances

British Open: 1 finals (0 title, 1 runner-up)

Hong Kong Open: 1 final (0 title, 1 runner-up)

Qatar Classic: 1 final (0 title, 1 runner-up)

See also
 List of WISPA number 1 ranked players
 Official Women's Squash World Ranking

External links 
 
 
 Article at Squashtalk.com (February 2002)

1977 births
Living people
American female squash players
English female squash players
South African female squash players
Commonwealth Games bronze medallists for South Africa
Commonwealth Games medallists in squash
Squash players at the 1998 Commonwealth Games
Pan American Games gold medalists for the United States
Pan American Games silver medalists for the United States
Pan American Games medalists in squash
Squash players at the 2007 Pan American Games
Squash players at the 2015 Pan American Games
Alumni of St Mary's School, Waverley
Sportspeople from Manchester
Medalists at the 2015 Pan American Games
21st-century American women
Medallists at the 1998 Commonwealth Games